Emeritus is the tenth studio album by American rapper Scarface. The album was released December 2, 2008, on Rap-A-Lot Records, Asylum Records, and Warner Bros. Records in the United States. At the time of its release, he had stated that it would be his final studio album. The album debuted at number 24 on the U.S. Billboard 200 chart, selling 42,000 copies in its first week. It has sold 167,000 copies in the United States . Upon its release, Emeritus received praise from music critics, with critical response aggregator Metacritic assigning a score of 85/100.

Track listing

Personnel
Credits for Emeritus adapted from Allmusic.

* Cey Adams – art direction, design
 John Bido – mastering, mixing
 Cory Mo – audio engineer
 Mike Dean – producer, engineer, mastering, mixing, audio engineer
 Christian Gugielmo – audio engineer
 Mike Mo – engineer, audio engineer
 N.O. Joe – producer

 Nottz – audio engineer
 Anthony Price – management
 J. Prince – executive producer, audio production
 Scarface – audio production
 Marc Smilow – audio engineer
 Tone Capone – producer
 Gina Victoria – engineer, audio engineer

Chart positions

Weekly charts

Year-end charts

References

2008 albums
Scarface (rapper) albums
Albums produced by Cool & Dre
Albums produced by Illmind
Albums produced by DJ Green Lantern
Albums produced by Jake One
Albums produced by N.O. Joe
Albums produced by Nottz
Albums produced by Scram Jones
Albums produced by Sha Money XL
Rap-A-Lot Records albums